"Desperados Under the Eaves" is a song written and performed by Warren Zevon from his eponymous 1976 album.

The song describes the narrator's growing alcoholism. "Cooped up in his shitty motel room with the shakes, a drink-desperate Zevon wittily narrates his frustration with L.A.'s refusal to give anyone a free pass. Even if it sinks into the ocean, the city will still get its due. You may hate it here, but you can't escape ('Heaven help the one who leaves') so long as you're empty-handed."

This song features background vocals from Carl Wilson and Billy Hinsche of The Beach Boys as well as Jackson Browne and J.D. Souther. When conducting the string section for this song, Zevon kept the veteran players "on his side" with pre-written humor. Zevon has said in interviews that this is one of his most personal songs.

The LA Weekly listed the song as number 10 in its list of "The 20 Best Songs Ever Written About L.A."

The song was used in the season 3 episode "If You Have Ghosts" of the HBO series True Detective.

References

Warren Zevon songs
1976 songs
Songs written by Warren Zevon